Fimbulisen is a glaciated area in Sabine Land at Spitsbergen, Svalbard. It is located between Von Postbreen and Sassendalen, and covers an area of about 100 km2.

References

Glaciers of Spitsbergen